Randalls Bluff is an extinct town in Winston County, Mississippi, United States.

A post office was located in Randalls Bluff until 1905.

Nothing remains of the settlement, which is today covered by forest.

References

Former populated places in Winston County, Mississippi
Former populated places in Mississippi